Isidore Fernandes (born 2 January 1947) is an Indian prelate of the Catholic Church who served as the tenth Bishop of the Diocese of Allahabad from 1988 until 2013.

Early life 
Isidore was born in Kalathur, Udupi on 2 January 1947, to Casmir and Lucy Fernandes.

Priesthood 
Isidore completed his high school studies at St. Mary's High School in Shirva, Udupi, Karnataka. He then joined the St. Paul's Minor Seminary in Lucknow and was then sent to the prestigious Papal Seminary in Pune, where he studied philosophy and theology. Isidore was ordained to the priesthood by Most. Rev. William Gomes, the then Bishop of Poona, on 29 October 1972.

Episcopate 
Fernandes was appointed as bishop by Pope John Paul II on 5 May 1988, and his episcopal ordination took place on 4 Aug 1988, at the hands of Most Rev. Cecil D'Sa, the then Archbishop of Agra. At the time of his episcopal ordination, Isidore (41), was one of the youngest Catholic bishops in India.

On Thursday, 31 January 2013, Pope Benedict XVI accepted the resignation of Bishop Isidore Fernandes, from the pastoral care of the Diocese of Allahabad, according to Canon Law 401 § 2. He became Honorary Member of Allahabad; no successor was immediately named, but Bishop Ignatius Menezes, Bishop Emeritus of Ajmer was appointed by the Pope to serve as Apostolic Administrator.

References

External links

Catholic Hierarchy

1947 births
20th-century Roman Catholic bishops in India
21st-century Roman Catholic bishops in India
Bishops appointed by Pope John Paul II
Christian clergy from Mangalore
Living people